The following are the scheduled events of sailing for the year 2019 throughout the world.

International sailing events
 August 12 – 17: 2019 Youth Sailing World Championships in  Ekaterinburg
 August 6 – 10: 2019 Women's Match Racing World Championship in  Lysekil

2019 Sailing World Cup
 September 9 – 16, 2018: SWC #1 in  Enoshima
 470 winners:  (Keiju Okada & Jumpei Hokazono) (m) /  (Afrodite Zegers & Anneloes van Veen) (f)
 49er(FX) winners:  (James Peters & Fynn Sterritt) (m) /  (Martine Grael & Kahena Kunze) (f)
 Laser(Radial) winners:  Elliot Hanson (m) /  Marit Bouwmeester (f)
 RS:X winners:  Kiran Badloe (m) /  Chen Peina (f)
 Men's Finn winner:  Nicholas Heiner
 Mixed Nacra 17 winners:  (Jason Waterhouse & Lisa Darmanin)
 January 27 – February 3: SWC #2 in  Miami
 470 winners:  (Jordi Xammar & Nicolás Rodríguez García-Paz) (m) /  (Frederike Loewe & Anna Markfort) (f)
 49er(FX) winners:  (Erik Heil & Thomas Plößel) (m) /  (Martine Grael & Kahena Kunze) (f)
 Laser(Radial) winners:  Hermann Tomasgaard (m) /  ZHANG Dongshuang (f)
 RS:X winners:  YE Bing (m) /  LU Yunxiu (f)
 Men's Finn winner:  Max Salminen
 Mixed Nacra 17 winners:  (Jason Waterhouse & Lisa Darmanin)
 April 22 – 28: SWC #3 in  Genoa
 470 winners:  (Paul Snow-Hansen & Daniel Willcox) (m) /  (Fernanda Oliveira & Ana Barbachan) (f)
 49er(FX) winners:  (David Gilmour & Lachy Gilmour) (m) /  (Odile van Aanholt & Marieke Jongens) (f)
 Laser(Radial) winners:  Jonatan Vadnai (m) /  Anne-Marie Rindom (f)
 Men's Finn winner:  Jorge Zarif
 Mixed Nacra 17 winners:  (Iker Martínez de Lizarduy & Olga Maslivets)
 June 2 – 9: SWC #4 (final) in  Marseille

470
 January 19 – 21: 2019 470 North American Championships in  Coconut Grove Sailing Club (Miami)
 Winners:  (Panagiotis Mantis & Pavlos Kagialis) (m) /  (Camille Lecointre & Aloise Retornaz) (f)
 March 14 – 17: 2019 470 South American Championships in  Porto Alegre
 Winners:  (Ricardo Paranhos & Rodolfo Streibel) (m) /  (Fernanda Oliveira & Ana Barbachan) (f)
 May 6 – 14: 2019 470 Open European Championships in  Sanremo
 European winners:  (Anton Dahlberg & Fredrik Bergström) (m) /  (Camille Lecointre & Aloise Retornaz) (f)
 Men's Open winners:  (Mathew Belcher & William Ryan)
 June 30 – July 7: 2019 470 Junior World Championships in  Portorož
 July 15 – 20: 2019 470 Masters Cup in  Centro Vela Alto Lario
 July 23 – 30: 2019 470 Junior European Championships in  Vilagarcía de Arousa
 August 2 – 9: 2019 470 World Championships in  Enoshima
 September 12 – 15: 2019 470 Eastern Europe Championship in  Elektrėnai

49er
 May 13 – 19: 2019 49er & 49er FX European Championship in  Weymouth
 49er winners:  (Peter Burling & Blair Tuke)
 49er FX winners:  (Martine Grael & Kahena Kunze)
 July 3 – 7: 2019 49er Junior World Championship in  Risør
 November 25 – 28: 2019 49er & 49er FX Oceania Championship in  Auckland
 November 29 – December 8: 2019 49er & 49er FX World Championships in  Auckland

Finn
 May 10 – 18: 2019 Finn European Championship in  Athens
 Winner:  Giles Scott
 U23 winner:  Joan Cardona
 June 7 – 14: 2019 Finn World Masters in  Skovshoved (Copenhagen)
 July 14 – 20: 2019 Finn Silver Sup in  Anzio
 September 11 – 15: 2019 Finn European Masters in  Schwerin
 December 13 – 21: 2019 Finn Gold Cup in  Melbourne

Laser
 July 2 – 9: 2019 Laser World Championship (Men's Standard) in  Sakaiminato
 July 17 – 24: 2019 Laser Radial World Championship for Men and Women in  Sakaiminato
 July 24 – 31: 2019 Laser Radial Youth World Championships in  Kingston
 August 16 – 23: 2019 Laser 4.7 Youth World Championships in  Kingston
 September 5 – 14: 2019 Laser Masters World Championships in  Port Zélande
 October 26 – November 2: 2019 Laser Under-21 World Championships in  Split

Nacra 17
 March 15 – 19: 2019 Nacra 17 Asian Championship in  Shanghai (Dianshan Lake)
 Winners:  (SHI Junjie & ZHOU Qianaqian)
 May 13 – 19: 2019 Nacra 17 European Championship in  Weymouth
 Winners:  (Ben Saxton & Nicola Boniface)
 July 3 – 7: 2019 Nacra 17 Junior World Championship in  Risør
 November 25 – 28: 2019 Nacra 17 Oceania Championship in  Auckland
 November 29 – December 8: 2019 Nacra 17 World Championship in  Auckland

RS:X
 January 21 – 23: 2019 RS:X North American Championships in  Miami
 Winners:  Louis Giard (m) /  Helene Noesmoen (f)
 April 7 – 13: 2019 RS:X European & Youth European Championships and Open Trophy in  Palma de Mallorca
 Senior winners:  Kiran Badloe (m) /  Lilian de Geus (f)
 U21 winners:  Yoav Cohen (m) /  Emma Wilson (f)
 Youth (European) winners:  Fabien Pianazza (m) /  Naama Gazit (f)
 U17 winners:  Daniel Basik Tashtash (m) /  Manon Pianazza (f)
 August 4 – 10: 2019 RS:X Windsurfing Youth World Championships in  Saint Petersburg
 September 22 – 28: 2019 RS:X World Championship in  Torbole
 October 6 – 12: 2019 RS:X Windsurfing African Championships in  Algiers

References

 
Sailing by year